Kevin Dewayne McCullar Jr. (born March 15, 2001) is an American college basketball player for the Kansas Jayhawks of the Big 12 Conference. He previously played for the Texas Tech Red Raiders.

High school career
McCullar played basketball for Karen Wagner High School in San Antonio, Texas. As a sophomore, he helped his team reach the Class 6A state title game. In his junior season, McCullar averaged 16.8 points, 6.6 rebounds and 3.8 assists per game, before fracturing his tibia during the playoffs. He opted to graduate early and bypass his senior season. A consensus four-star recruit, he committed to playing college basketball for Texas Tech over offers from Houston, Kansas State and Louisville.

College career
McCullar redshirted his first season at Texas Tech to rehabilitate after fracturing his tibia as a junior in high school. Despite his absence, his team reached the national championship game. As a freshman, McCullar averaged six points, 3.2 rebounds and 1.2 steals per game. In his sophomore season, he averaged 10.4 points, 6.3 rebounds and 1.7 steals per game, earning All-Big 12 honorable mention. On November 12, 2021, he scored a career-high 24 points in an 88–62 win against Grambling State. As a junior, McCullar averaged 10.1 points, 4.6 rebounds, and 3.1 assists per game. He hit 28 of 90 three pointers for 31.1%.

On April 27, 2022, he entered the transfer portal while also declaring for the 2022 NBA draft and maintaining his college eligibility. On May 19, 2022, McCullar announced he was transferring to Kansas while also remaining in the NBA draft. On June 1, 2022, McCullar removed himself from the NBA Draft and announced he would be playing for the Jayhawks. As a senior, he was named to the Third Team All-Big 12 as well as the All-Defensive Team.

Career statistics

College

|-
| style="text-align:left;"| 2018–19
| style="text-align:left;"| Texas Tech
| style="text-align:center;" colspan="11"|  Redshirt
|-
| style="text-align:left;"| 2019–20
| style="text-align:left;"| Texas Tech
| 29 || 6 || 18.6 || .512 || .286 || .725 || 3.2 || .7 || 1.2 || .3 || 6.0
|-
| style="text-align:left;"| 2020–21
| style="text-align:left;"| Texas Tech
| 20 || 19 || 30.4 || .416 || .283 || .704 || 6.3 || 2.1 || 1.7 || .8 || 10.4
|-
| style="text-align:left;"| 2021–22
| style="text-align:left;"| Texas Tech
| 29 || 24 || 29.9 || .402 || .311 || .725 || 4.6 || 3.1 || 1.4 || .2 || 10.1
|-
| style="text-align:left;"| 2022–23
| style="text-align:left;"| Kansas
| 7 || 7 || 29.7 || .414 || .304 || .684 || 7.3 || 2.1 || 1.9 || .9 || 9.7
|- class="sortbottom"
| style="text-align:center;" colspan="2"| Career
| 85 || 56 || 25.8 || .430 || .299 || .716 || 4.7 || 2.0 || 1.4 || .4 || 8.8

Personal life
McCullar's father, Kevin Sr., played college football for Texas Tech as a linebacker, before playing professionally with the Frankfurt Galaxy and Chicago Enforcers.

References

External links
Kansas Jayhawks bio
Texas Tech Red Raiders bio

2001 births
Living people
American men's basketball players
Basketball players from San Antonio
Kansas Jayhawks men's basketball players
Shooting guards
Texas Tech Red Raiders basketball players